

Publicly accessible road passes by Province 
Eastern Cape Passes
Western Cape Passes
Northern Cape Passes
Free State Passes
Gauteng Passes
KwaZulu Natal Passes
Limpopo Province Passes
Mpumalanga Passes
Northwest Province Passes

External links
 Google Map of Passes
 Wild Dog Adventure Riding

Mountain passes
South Africa mountain passes

Mountain passes